Urris is a valley to the west of the parish of Clonmany, in County Donegal, Ireland. It comprises the townlands of Crossconnell, Dunaff, Kinnea, Leenan, Letter, and Urrismenagh. It sits on the eastern side of Loch Swilly and it is bounded to the south-east by the Urris hills, and to the east by Binion hill.  To the north, there is Rockstown bay and Tullagh peninsula. There are two entrances to Urris; the Gap of Mamore, and Crossconnell.

Urris has some local tourist attractions, such the Dunaff cliffs, Tullagh  beach, Rockstown Harbor, Leenan pier and Gap of Mamore. There are a number of traditional thatched cottages in good condition within Urris.

History

Mesolithic period 
Dunaff bay is the site of Ireland's oldest neolithic campsite. The bay lies at the mouth of Lough Swilly,  between the cliffs of Dunaff Head to the north and  Leenan Head to the south.  The site contained a large number of early Irish Mesolithic artifacts, including unabraded flints comprising a few leaf-shaped flakes, some blade-like flakes and a large amount of waste material.  The location is regarded as an "industrial site" producing material associated with the so-called Early Larnian tradition.

Colonel Daniel McNeill 
During the early 18th century, the valley was terrorized by a local landlord who preyed on local young women.  Colonel Daniel McNeill was a Scottish Planter, who fought at Battle of the Boyne, and was one of the defenders of Londonderry.  Afterwards, he lived in Binion. He maintained a group of Herdsmen, known locally as "The Yowmen" that terrorized the local population.  Any woman he desired, his henchmen brought her to Binion, where she was allegedly raped. If any of his victims became pregnant, he allocated a small portion of land to support the child. These allotments of land become known as "McNeills Roods".  There are many of these allotments of land scattered through Urris and on the road to Clonmany. At the fair at Pollen, he attempted to kidnap a young local woman, but failed when she managed to run into crowd.  Later that evening, when he was returning from the fair, he was ambushed and murdered by a group of local men.

McNeill was buried in the graveyard of Straid Church. In the mid-19th century, it was still possible to identify his grave, where it was recorded that he died on 11 September 1709, aged 59.

Wolfe Tone 
Theobald Wolfe Tone, leader of the 1798 Irish Rebellion, was captured by the Royal Navy off Dunaff Head, Lough Swilly in November 1798.

Poitín production 
In the early 19th century, Urris became a center of the illegal poitín distillation industry, and continued to be one of the main economic activities of the area throughout the century. Due to its remote and barren geography, the Urris Hills were an ideal place for poitín-making because the area was surrounded by mountains and only accessible through the Mamore Gap over the Urris Hills and Crossconnell to the East. Derry provided a major market for the trade.  In an effort to curtail illegal production, the authorities decided to levy "township fines" - a collective fine that was placed on an entire community if there was a suspicion that some of its residents were engaged in poitín production.

In 1812, to protect their lucrative business, the distillers established a system of scouts that warned of the impending arrival of government officials.  People from Urris would take positions above the road on each side of Mamore gap and hurl down rocks, preventing government officials from entering the area. The locals also barricaded the road at Crossconnell to keep out the revenue police and local constabulary.

This period of relative independence began the autumn of 1812.  In May 1815, the authorities re-established control of the Urris Hills when General Dalziel led a military force into the valley and brought this short period of self-rule to an end.  Subsequently, this period was later known as the time of the "Poitin Republic of Urris".  The term "Poitín Republic" appears to be a 20th century invention, which was first used in the 1920s.  There are no available accounts of how the area was governed during this period.

Once the authorities had restored revenue collections in the area, the local population were again subjected to frequent raids from the Revenue Police and township fines.  These raids were often accompanied by public disturbances.  In 1818, the disruption caused by these raids led the local population to petition parliament for relief from the frequent levying of harsh fines.  The text of the petition highlighted many of the concerns of the local population:
That the petitioners are compelled to endure the most vexatious and oppressive exactions under the name of fines for illicit distillation, imposed upon the aforesaid Parish and townlands contained therein; that many persons who are guiltless or incapable of illicit distillation, have been forced to pay large portions of such fines, and that all proofs of individual innocence are rejected as reasons for exemption from payment of them; that the severity of diverse persons professing to bear excise commissions has been so great that alarming disturbances have broken out in their neighborhood and that the ordinary execution of the laws has failed in restoring tranquility.

Poitin continued to play an important role in the local economy in the pre-famine period.  In 1843, the Revenue Police conducted a major raid on an active poitin still owned by Bryan Harkin of Lenan.  Harkin, along with four other men, were arrested.  Upon hearing of the arrests, a large number of local inhabitants gathered to prevent the arrests.  Eventually, Harkin persuaded the crowd to disperse and agreed to accompany the police to Buncrana. Harkin's protection of the police later formed the basis for an appeal after he was convicted of illegal poitin production.

Land reform 
The ownership of land was very contentious issue throughout the 19th century.  During the 18th century, the primary landlords were the Bishop of Derry and the Marquis of Donegal. In 1810, the townlands of Tullagh, Kinnea, Letter, Dunaff, and Urrismenagh were sold an absentee landlord - Sir Robert Harvey.

Sir Roger Casement 
In 1904, the Irish nationalist Sir Roger Casement spent six months learning Gaelic at an Irish Language College in Urris. He lodged in a house in Tiernsligo.  He subsequently returned to Inishowen in 1913, where he tried to organize the Irish Volunteers within the Urris Valley.

Second World War 

At around 3pm, 11 April 1941, a Vickers Wellington bomber (W5653) crashed into the Urris Hills, resulting in the deaths of its six crew members.  The cause of the crash was a navigational error.  The plane was returning from a convoy escort patrol to  RAF Limavady.  The pilot became disorientated in thick fog and mistook Lough Swilly for Lough Foyle, while attempting a visual landing at Limavady.   As the plane descended, it crashed into the hills at an elevation of 770 feet.  Irish Free State soldiers began an immediate search of the area, which was hampered by thick fog. Due to weather conditions and the difficulty of reaching the crash site, it was not immediately possible to bring to bodies down from the hill. The dead airmen were F/O Alfred  Cattley (40888) who piloted the craft; P/O James Montague (81359); Sgt John Bateman (959540); Sgt Francis Whalley (977309); Sgt Frederick Neill (976110);  and Sgt Brinley Francis Badman (976192). They were assigned to RAF 221 squadron.

In June 1942, a mine washed up in Urris and exploded.   There were no reported fatalities or injuries.

Binion Head Fishing Disaster 
On 17 August 1962 three fishermen from Rockstown drowned when their lobster boat hit submerged rocks and sank off Binion Head.  The three men were Patrick Doherty (aged 40), John McGilloway (aged 50) and his son, also called John McGilloway (aged 24).  Patrick Doherty left behind a wife and five children ranging in age from ten to four years.

Places of interest 

 Mamore Gap is a pass through the Urris hills that links the local town of Buncrana and Urris.
 Dunaff Hill - A mountain with an elevation of 210 meters (689 feet). Its coordinates are 55.2783° North and 7.5153° West.
 Bothanvarra - 70m high sea stack, just beyond Dunaff head.
 Raghtin Mor (Irish: Reachtain Mhór, meaning "great, big element") - A mountain in the Urris Hills on the south-east side of the valley.  It has an elevation of 502 m (1,647 ft).  On the mountain summit stands a megalithic cairn.
 Leenan Fort  - A military installation that was built in 1895 to defend the deep-water anchorages of Lough Swilly. It was initially armed with three 9.2 inch guns. It was refitted in 1911 with two newer 9.2 inch models. During the First World War,  the Royal Navy used Lough Swilly  as an anchorage for elements of the Grand Fleet and as a staging point for Atlantic convoys. After the Irish War of Independence Lough Swilly and the accompanying forts at Leenan and Dunree were considered to be one of the three Treaty Ports specified in the Anglo-Irish Treaty.  These military installations, including Fort Leenan, were handed over to the Irish Free State in 1938.  Fort Leenan was closed in 1946.  The site is now derelict and contains many dangerous hazards.

Irish language 
The Urris area was the last bastion on the Inishowen peninsula where the Irish language was spoken regularly.  The Ordnance Map Surveyor - John O'Donovan - visited the area in August 1835. He reported back to the Superintendent of the Ordnance Survey in Dublin that "the men only, who go to markets and fairs, speak a little English, the women and children speak Irish only".   During the early 20th century, Urris had a language school  known as the Irish College.  The area had a number of native Irish speakers up to the 1940s.

Religion 
On the crest of Mamore Gap there are a number of religious sites associated with the Roman Catholic tradition. Saint Columba is believed to have vanquished the water dragon Giollamach in the pass.

The area is served by St. Michael's Roman Catholic Church, which was built in 1888.

Culture 
Irish Nationalist poet Alice Milligan made a direct reference to Urris in her poem "A song of Freedom":

Folklore

The Lost Piper 
Although technically not in Urris, Binion Hill is associated with the Legend of the Lost Piper. At the foot of the hill there is a cave known as Poll an Phiobaire (The Piper's Cave), which according to local tradition has no end. One day a piper heard that the cave contained a crock of gold. He entered the cave playing 'Girls will be old women before I return.’ According to the legend, he disappeared in the cave but on occasions it is still possible to hear him playing at the mouth of the cave.

Sport 
The area hosts the Urris Gaelic Athletic Association team for Gaelic football, which has a pitch located just outside Urris, in the Townland of Straid. The club were county intermediate champions in 1982.

See also
 List of towns and villages in Ireland

References

Geography of County Donegal
Towns and villages in County Donegal